Splitsvilla 12, styled as Splitsvilla X2, is the twelfth season of the Indian reality TV series MTV Splitsvilla. It premiered on 16 August 2019 on MTV India. Hosted by Sunny Leone and Rannvijay Singha the season consisted of fifteen boys +1 Wildcard and ten girls who came to find true love. Shot in Jaipur,the theme of the season was "Your Best Shot at Love". Shrey Mittal & Priyamvada Kant won the season whereas Ashish Bhatia and Miesha Iyer emerged as 1st Runner-Up.

Splitsvilla Contestants

References

External links 

Official website

Indian reality television series
2019 Indian television series debuts
2020 Indian television series debuts
MTV (Indian TV channel) original programming
Hindi-language television shows
Flavor of Love
Dating and relationship reality television series